In statistics, the widely applicable information criterion (WAIC), also known as Watanabe–Akaike information criterion, is the generalized version of the Akaike information criterion (AIC) onto singular statistical models.

Widely applicable Bayesian information criterion (WBIC) is the generalized version of Bayesian information criterion (BIC) onto singular statistical models.

WBIC is the average log likelihood function over the posterior distribution with the inverse temperature > 1/log n where n is the sample size.

Both WAIC and WBIC can be numerically calculated without any information about a true distribution.

See also 
Akaike information criterion
Bayesian information criterion
Deviance information criterion
Hannan–Quinn information criterion
Shibata information criterion

References

Model selection
Bayesian statistics